Troublemakers (also known as The Fight Before Christmas) is a 1994 spaghetti Western comedy film. It is the last pairing of Terence Hill (who also directed) and Bud Spencer.

Plot

Travis, a gunslinger receives a letter from his mother Maw, asking him to bring his brother Moses and his family to a Christmas reunion and to give them an unknown treasure she claims to have inherited it from his father. Moses is a bounty hunter, who is angry at Maw, for letting his stolen horses loose, forcing Travis to set up a plan. Travis saves an outlaw named Sam Stone from being hanged and teams up with his brother to catch him. When the brothers stay at Moses' family's house, Travis gives them plans to get to Maw's. When they head off the next morning, Moses' family heads on their way to Maw's.

While passing some time at a town, Travis gets into a fist fight with a man, named Dodge and his gang, who were teasing a young woman. Moses unwillingly comes and helps Travis finish them off. The woman, Bridget invites the brothers to have cookies and tea with her and her sister, Melie. After leaving and setting up camp, Travis finds Stone and gang, talking about robbing a bank, the next day at noon. The next day, the brothers plan a trap to catch Stone. The plan backfires when they come in at the wrong time. The sheriff and his deputy mistake Travis and Moses as part of Stone's gang and arrest them.

Bridget bails Travis out, revealing that Stone took their beloved bear. When Moses is sentenced to hang the next morning, Travis tries to free him in the same way he freed Stone (shooting the noose.) A dog attacks Travis and Moses is hanged, but due to his enormous size, he destroys the gallows. Moses survives with only a few splinters. He comes up with a plan to catch Stone, but the plan fails and they are captured. Travis reveals to Stone that he saved his life, and Stone lets them go. Moses comes up with plan B, which works. When Moses falls asleep, Travis frees Stone and Stone dummy-ties him.

Moses abandons Travis, but he hitches a ride from nearby Navajo Indians. Moses' son, Junior wants to buy a horse for his father. He heads to town and is captured by Stone, who learns of the Christmas reunion. Travis and Moses reunite and wait for Stone's next move. Junior escapes and follows the brothers. He camps out for the night. Junior wakes up and finds himself face-to-face with a western diamondback rattlesnake. He attempts to flee but gets bitten on the leg. He manages to ride to Travis and Moses' camp. The brothers take him to Bridget's and Melie's. Bridget injects Junior with a serum that neutralizes the venom.

Travis reveals the reunion, angering Moses. Moses is about to fight with Travis, but Junior warns them about Stone's plan. Before leaving, Bridget and Travis share a kiss. The brothers finally arrive at Maw's and discover that she is holding Stone captive. Moses' family, Travis, Bridget and Melie all share a Christmas dinner as a family. However, the sheriff, deputy, Dodge and his gang plan to kill them but drop their guns when they are hypnotized by the night sky's beauty. A giant fist fight occurs between the two groups, involving the family winning. One of the daughters calls the event "The Fight Before Christmas."

The next morning, Maw reveals that the treasure is where their hearts are, much to Stone's dismay. Maw then leaves for Denver and all the people have their picture taken by the photographer.

Cast
 Terence Hill as Travis
 Bud Spencer as Moses
 Boots Southerland as Sam Stone
 Ruth Buzzi as Grandma Maw
 Jonathan Tucker as Moses Junior
 Neil Summers as Dodge
 Anne Kasprik as Bridget
 Eva Hassmann as Melie
 Ron Carey as Sheriff Fox
 Fritz Sperberg as Deputy Sheriff Joey
 Radha Delamarter as Janie
 John David Garfield as Photographer
 Paul Ukena, Tom Eiden, Bo Gray, Ottaviano Dell'Acqua as The outlaws
 Forrie J. Smith, Steven G. Tyler, Massimiliano Ubaldi as The cowboys
 Paloma von Broadley as Jessica
 Samantha Waidler as Mary Lou
 Kevin Barker, Brian Barker, Charlie Barker, Pilar O'Connell, Sarah Waidler, Lauren Myers, Natasha Goslow as The sons
 Patrick Myers as Patrick
 Jess Hill as Telegraph clerk
 Geoffrey Martin as Executioner
 Lou Baker as Preacher
 Michael Huddleston: Blacksmith
 Adam Taylor: Blackjack
 Sommer Betsworth: Girl

See also
 List of Christmas films

External links

1994 films
1990s Western (genre) comedy films
1990s Christmas films
Spaghetti Western films
Italian Western (genre) comedy films
1990s English-language films
English-language Italian films
English-language German films
1990s Italian-language films
Films directed by Terence Hill
Films scored by Pino Donaggio
Terence Hill and Bud Spencer
Films about siblings
1994 comedy films
1994 multilingual films
Italian multilingual films
American multilingual films
German multilingual films
American Western (genre) comedy films
German Western (genre) comedy films